Tinsukia College, established in 1956, is one of the oldest undergraduate, coeducational college situated in Tinsukia, Assam. This college is affiliated with the Dibrugarh University.

Departments

Science
Physics
Mathematics
Chemistry
Statistics
Computer Science
Botany
Zoology

Arts and Commerce
 Assamese
Hindi
 English
History
Education
Economics
Philosophy
Political Science
Geography
Commerce

References

External links

Universities and colleges in Assam
Colleges affiliated to Dibrugarh University
Educational institutions established in 1956
1956 establishments in Assam